St Barnabas’ Church, Ryland Street, Birmingham is a former Church of England parish church in Birmingham.

History

The foundation stone was laid on 1 August 1859 on land five by Miss Ryland of Barford in Warwick. It was built to the designs of the architect William Bourne of Dudley, in Hampstead redstone, with Hollington stone dressings. It was consecrated on 24 October 1860

The church opened schools in 1862 alongside the church building in Ryland Street.

A parish was assigned out of St Martin in the Bull Ring in 1896. This was enlarged in 1901 by part of the parish of Christ Church, Birmingham.

The church was demolished in 1966.

Organ

The organ was installed by Bevington. A specification of the organ can be found on the National Pipe Organ Register.

References

Church of England church buildings in Birmingham, West Midlands
Churches completed in 1860
Barnabas